Jefferson Township is the name of some places in the U.S. state of Michigan:

 Jefferson Township, Cass County, Michigan
 Jefferson Township, Hillsdale County, Michigan

See also 
 Jefferson Township (disambiguation)

Michigan township disambiguation pages